Olivetolic acid is an organic compound that is an intermediate in the biosynthetic pathway of the cannabinoids  in Cannabis sativa.

The ester dimer of olivetolic acid, anziaic acid, is found in lichen.

References 

Benzoic acids
Cannabinoids